Beijing University of Chinese Medicine (BUCM) is a public university in China. Founded in 1956, the Beijing University of Chinese Medicine is one of the first traditional Chinese medical institutions for higher learning in China. It is a traditional higher learning institution, Double First Class University and former 211 Project for national development. The former Beijing University of Chinese Medicine and the former Beijing College of Acupuncture, Orthopedics and Traumatology merged into the new Beijing University of Chinese Medicine on July 31, 2000 and became a priority university directly under the supervision of the Ministry of Education. It is a Chinese state Double First Class University identified by the Ministry of Education.

In recent years the university has established itself as a leader in the field of TCM education, scientific research and medical treatment.

See also
 Beijing Hospital of Traditional Chinese Medicine

References

External links
 Official website
 Campus real three-dimensional map

 
Universities and colleges in Beijing
Traditional Chinese medicine
Medical schools in China
Educational institutions established in 1956
1956 establishments in China
Medical and health organizations based in China
Plan 111